Dr. Angelika Trabert (born 9 October 1967), is a German doctor and para-equestrian rider. She made her international debut in 1991, and went on to compete at five consecutive Summer Paralympics for her country, winning silver and bronze multiple medals. In addition, she was the 2009 European Champion in freestyle. Outside of the sport, she is an Anaesthetist who has worked internationally, including providing medical care in rural Africa.

Career
Angelika Trabert was born on 9 October 1967 in Frankfurt, Germany. She has dysmelia, a congenital disability which means that she was born without legs, and with only three fingers on her right hand. At the age of six, she began to ride horses and went on to compete internationally for Germany from 1991 onwards, in the Paralympic classification of grade II.

Her first individual victory came at the 2009 European Para-Dressage Championship in Kristiansand, Norway, in the freestyle competition. She also won gold in the freestyle grade II on her horse Ariva-Avanti at the 2010 FEI World Equestrian Games in Lexington, Kentucky with a score of 75.900. She has also competed at five Summer Paralympic Games from the 1996 Games in Atlanta, Georgia, onwards. Across three separate Games, she has won three silver medals and a bronze. In 2018, the National Cowgirl Museum and Hall of Fame inducted her.

In addition to her equestrian career, Trabert works as an Anaesthetist, a job she takes leave from in order to compete in Para-equestrian. This role has led to her not only working in Germany as a doctor, but also travelling to Africa to provide medical care in rural communities.

References

External links
 
 
 
 

1967 births
Living people
German female equestrians
German dressage riders
German anesthesiologists
Paralympic equestrians of Germany
Paralympic equestrians of the United States
Paralympic silver medalists for Germany
Paralympic bronze medalists for Germany
Paralympic medalists in equestrian
Equestrians at the 1996 Summer Paralympics
Equestrians at the 2000 Summer Paralympics
Equestrians at the 2004 Summer Paralympics
Equestrians at the 2008 Summer Paralympics
Equestrians at the 2012 Summer Paralympics
Medalists at the 1996 Summer Paralympics
Medalists at the 2008 Summer Paralympics
Medalists at the 2012 Summer Paralympics
Cowgirl Hall of Fame inductees
Sportspeople from Frankfurt
20th-century German women
21st-century German women
Women anesthesiologists
20th-century women physicians
21st-century women physicians
20th-century German physicians
21st-century German physicians